Archduchess Hermine of Austria (Hermine Amalie Marie; 14 September 1817 – 13 February 1842) was a member of the House of Habsburg-Lorraine.

Biography
Hermine was the daughter of Archduke Joseph, Palatine of Hungary and Princess Hermine of Anhalt-Bernburg-Schaumburg-Hoym. Her mother died shortly after giving birth to her and her twin brother, Archduke Stephen, Palatine of Hungary. She was brought up by her stepmother, Duchess Maria Dorothea of Württemberg. She spent much of her childhood in Buda and at the family estate in Alcsútdoboz and received an excellent education. Contemporaries described Archduchess Hermine as comely, kind and modest. However, she was a slim young woman, frail body, and prone to diseases.

Hermine was Princess-Abbess of the Theresian Royal and Imperial Ladies Chapter of the Castle of Prague (1835-1842), and she died 13 February 1842 in Vienna, Austria.

Ancestry

References 

House of Habsburg-Lorraine
Hungarian people of Austrian descent
People from Buda
1817 births
1842 deaths
Burials at Palatinal Crypt